Larry Sanders (born November 21, 1988) is an American former professional basketball player. He played power forward for the Virginia Commonwealth University Rams before declaring himself eligible for the 2010 NBA draft and was selected 15th overall by the Milwaukee Bucks.

High school career
Sanders did not play basketball in the ninth grade, and the private school he attended did not offer it. However, after he transferred to Port St. Lucie High School, the school's basketball coach, Kareem Rodriguez, saw potential in the then 6'1" Sanders and prevailed on him to play for the team. Sanders grew to 6'4" in his second year and to 6'6" in his third. He would sprout further to 6'9" in his senior year. His production and growth spurt was enough that Rodriguez alerted his friend Tony Pujol, an assistant at Virginia Commonwealth University (VCU), to watch out for him. He began garnering statewide attention in his junior campaign as he helped Port St. Lucie reach the Class 5A state semifinals. In his senior year, while averaging 18.9 points and 13 rebounds, Sanders led Port St. Lucie (20–8) to the District 13-5A Championship, and was named by the Associated Press to the First Team All-State. He committed to the VCU Rams when major schools only just started to take interest in him.

College career
At VCU, he was keen to train under its then head coach Anthony Grant, who was known to have tutored standout big men at the University of Florida while he was still an assistant there. For his first two seasons for VCU, Sanders played 2nd star to guard Eric Maynor. He excelled in that role, utilizing his size and athleticism to disrupt teams defensively. As a sophomore, he helped the Rams into the 2009 NCAA tournament against the UCLA Bruins, but lost 65–64 in the first round of the tournament. Sanders went on to have a more prominent role in his junior season after Maynor was drafted into the NBA. As a junior Sanders averaged 14.4 points, 9.1 rebounds, and 2.6 blocks, with 53% field-goal accuracy, all statistical team highs, on his way to earning the second of his consecutive CAA Defensive Player of the Year awards in 2008–09 and 2009–10.

Larry Sanders announced in April 2010 after his junior year that he was departing VCU early to enter the NBA Draft.

Professional career

Milwaukee Bucks (2010–2015)
Sanders was chosen by the Milwaukee Bucks with the 15th overall pick in the 2010 NBA draft. On July 8, 2010, he signed a multi-year, rookie scaled contract with the Bucks. On February 20, 2011, he was assigned to the Fort Wayne Mad Ants of the NBA D-League. On February 26, 2011, he was recalled by the Bucks.

On November 30, 2012, he recorded his only career triple-double with 10 points, 12 rebounds and 10 blocks in a loss to Minnesota. He finished the season second in blocks per game behind Serge Ibaka. Sanders also finished third in voting for the NBA Most Improved Player Award, after Paul George and Greivis Vásquez.

On August 20, 2013, Sanders signed a four-year, $44 million contract extension with the Bucks.

In December 2013, Sanders was sidelined for 25 games after sustaining a torn ligament in his thumb in a night club altercation.  Sanders was fined for the two municipal citations of disorderly conduct and assault and battery charges, but police did not pursue further criminal charges. That same year he was cited twice for animal cruelty for leaving two German shepherd puppies outside without proper food, water, and shelter. 

On March 20, 2014, it was announced that Sanders would miss the rest of the 2013–14 season due to a fractured right orbital bone.

On April 4, 2014, Sanders was given a five-game suspension for violating the NBA's drug policy after testing positive for marijuana.

In December 2014, Sanders was placed on Bucks' inactive roster due to personal reasons. After a seven-game absence, Sanders appeared on the Bucks' bench on January 7, 2015, against the Phoenix Suns, but did not suit up. Rumors emerged that Sanders wanted to leave the sport, all of which were denied by his agent.

Sanders again violated the NBA's drug policy during the 2014–15 season and was subsequently suspended without pay for a minimum of ten games on January 16, 2015.

It was announced on February 21, 2015, following his second suspension for marijuana use, that the Bucks were buying out Sanders' contract. On February 25, a video of Sanders was released where he explained that he entered into a program at Rogers Memorial Hospital for anxiety, depression and mood disorders. He said that the program led him to realize "what's important, and where I would want to devote my time and energy" and that ultimately he realized that "for [basketball] to be consuming so much of my life and time right now ... it's not there for me. It's not that worth it." He did, however, claim to still love the game and that "if I get to a point where I feel I'm capable of playing basketball again, then I will."

On January 26, 2017, Sanders announced his decision to return to basketball.

Cleveland Cavaliers (2017)
On March 13, 2017, Sanders signed with the Cleveland Cavaliers. He made his debut for the Cavaliers the following night in a 128–98 win over the Detroit Pistons. He played the final 1:58 and missed his only shot attempt while recording two fouls. On April 12, 2017, he was waived by the Cavaliers after appearing in five games. During his stint with Cleveland, he had multiple assignments with the Canton Charge of the NBA Development League. He reportedly struggled keeping up with responsibilities on and off the court. Sanders later played with 3 Headed Monsters in the 2019 Big3 season.

Personal life

In his time away from basketball, Sanders created an artist collective, clothing line, and non-profit organization named Citizen of Matter. Sanders also worked as a music producer under the moniker L8 Show. Sanders received a placement on PartyNextDoor's second studio album titled PartyNextDoor 3 on a track titled "Don't Run".

Career statistics

NBA

Regular season

|-
| align="left" | 
| align="left" | Milwaukee
| 60 || 12 || 14.5|| .433 || - || .560 || 3.0 || .3 || .4 || 1.2 || 4.3
|-
| align="left" | 
| align="left" | Milwaukee
| 52 || 0 || 12.4 || .457 || .000 || .474 || 3.1 || .6 || .6 || 1.5 || 3.6
|-
| align="left" | 
| align="left" | Milwaukee
| 71 || 55 || 27.3 || .506 || .000 || .618 || 9.5 || 1.2 || .7 || 2.8 || 9.8
|-
| align="left" | 
| align="left" | Milwaukee
| 23 || 20 || 25.4 || .469 || .000 || .473 || 7.2 || .8 || .8 || 1.7 || 7.7
|-
| align="left" | 
| align="left" | Milwaukee
| 27 || 26 || 21.7 || .500 || – || .500 || 6.1 || .9 || 1.0 || 1.4 || 7.3
|-
| align="left" | 
| align="left" | Cleveland
| 5 || 0 || 2.6 || .250 || – || 1.000 || .8 || .0 || .2 || .2 || .8
|- class="sortbottom"
| style="text-align:center;" colspan="2"| Career
| 238 || 113 || 19.5 || .480 || .000 || .553 || 5.7 || .7 || .6 || 1.8 || 6.4

Playoffs

|-
| align="left" | 2013
| align="left" | Milwaukee
| 4 || 4 || 28.3 || .576 || – || .455 || 8.3 || 1.3 || .8 || 1.3 || 10.8
|- class="sortbottom"
| style="text-align:center;" colspan="2"| Career
| 4 || 4 || 28.3 || .576 || – || .455 || 8.3 || 1.3 || .8 || 1.3 || 10.8

References

External links

 NBA.com profile
 VCU Rams bio
 
 

1988 births
Living people
American men's basketball players
Basketball players from Florida
Big3 players
Canton Charge players
Centers (basketball)
Cleveland Cavaliers players
Doping cases in basketball
Fort Wayne Mad Ants players
Milwaukee Bucks draft picks
Milwaukee Bucks players
People from Port St. Lucie, Florida
Power forwards (basketball)
VCU Rams men's basketball players
American men's 3x3 basketball players